Asylum is a British comedy series which was shown on Paramount Comedy Channel in 1996. Set in a mental asylum, it ran for one series of six episodes. Unlike traditional sitcoms or comedy television shows, it was to some extent an opportunity for stand-up routines by various comedians, mixed with an overall story involving much black humour. It is significant for involving a large number of British comedians, many of whom went on to work on some of the most successful comedy programmes of the 2000s. It marked the first collaboration of Edgar Wright, Simon Pegg and Jessica Stevenson, who would go on to make cult sitcom Spaced and Shaun of the Dead. Many of the characters names were the same as those of the actors who portrayed them.

David Devant & His Spirit Wife were the "house band" for the series, performing segments in every episode, from their first album, Work, Lovelife, Miscellaneous. The lead-in track "Ginger" served as the programme's title music.

The series has yet to be released on DVD.

Cast and crew
Written by the cast and
 Co-writer & director - Edgar Wright
 Co-writer - David Walliams

Principal cast and characters
 Norman Lovett as Dr Lovett
 Simon Pegg as Simon
 Jessica Hynes as Martha & Nurse McFadden
 Julian Barratt as Julian/Victor Munro
 Paul Morocco as Paul
 Adam Bloom as Adam
 Mick O'Connor as Nobby Shanks

Guest stars
 Paul Tonkinson
 John Moloney
 Bill Bailey
 Howard Haigh
 Andy Parsons
 Henry Naylor
 David Walliams

External links

British television sitcoms
1996 British television series debuts
1996 British television series endings
1990s British black comedy television series
English-language television shows
Works set in psychiatric hospitals
1990s British sitcoms